Mark Astley (born March 30, 1969) is a Canadian former professional ice hockey defenceman. He was drafted by the Buffalo Sabres in the tenth round, 194th overall, of the 1989 NHL Entry Draft. He retired at the end of the 2006–2007 season.

In his NHL career, Astley played in 75 games, all for Buffalo. He scored four goals and had nineteen assists.

Astley won a silver medal playing for Canada in the 1994 Winter Olympics.

Awards and honours

Career statistics

Regular season and playoffs

International

References

External links

1969 births
Living people
Buffalo Sabres draft picks
Buffalo Sabres players
Calgary Canucks players
Canadian ice hockey defencemen
EHC Basel players
HC Ambrì-Piotta players
HC Lugano players
Ice hockey players at the 1994 Winter Olympics
Lake Superior State Lakers men's ice hockey players
Medalists at the 1994 Winter Olympics
Naturalised citizens of Switzerland
Olympic ice hockey players of Canada
Olympic medalists in ice hockey
Olympic silver medalists for Canada
Phoenix Roadrunners (IHL) players
Rochester Americans players
SC Langnau players
Ice hockey people from Calgary
Canadian expatriate ice hockey players in Switzerland
NCAA men's ice hockey national champions
AHCA Division I men's ice hockey All-Americans